To Rome with Love may refer to:

 To Rome with Love (TV series), an American sitcom 
 To Rome with Love (film), a 2012 magical realist romantic comedy film